Louis XIV (1638–1715), the Bourbon monarch of the Kingdom of France, was the son of King Louis XIII of France and Queen Anne.

The descendants of Louis XIV are numerous. Although only one of his children by his wife Maria Theresa of Spain survived past infancy, Louis had many illegitimate children by his mistresses. This article deals with the children of Louis XIV and in turn their senior descendants.

Legitimate issue by Maria Theresa of Spain

She was born as Infanta María Teresa of Spain (also known as María Teresa of Austria, because she was by birth a member of Casa d'Austria, House of Austria), at the Royal Monastery of El Escorial. Maria was the daughter of Philip IV of Spain and Elisabeth of France. María Teresa thus combined the blood of Philip III of Spain and Margarita of Austria, on her father's side, and that of Henry IV of France and Marie de' Medici, on her mother's side.

In his turn, Philip III was the son of Philip II of Spain and Anna of Austria who was, herself, a daughter of Maximilian II, Holy Roman Emperor and Maria of Spain. Philip II and Maria of Spain were siblings, being both children of Charles V, Holy Roman Emperor and Isabella of Portugal. María Teresa, therefore, like many Habsburgs, was a product of years and generations of royal intermarriage between cousins.

In 1659, as the war with France began to wind down, a union between the two royal families, of Spain and of France, was proposed as a means to secure peace. María Teresa and Louis XIV were double first-cousins, and it was proposed that they wed. His father was Louis XIII of France, who was the brother of her mother, while her father was brother to Anne of Austria, his mother.

Such a prospect was intensely enticing to Anne of Austria, mother of Louis XIV and aunt of María Teresa, who desired an end to hostilities between her native country, Spain, and her adopted one, France, and who hoped this to come by her niece becoming her daughter-in-law. However, Spanish hesitation and procrastination led to a scheme in which Cardinal Mazarin, the First Minister of France, pretended to seek a marriage for his master with Margaret of Savoy. When Philip IV of Spain heard of the meeting at Lyon between the Houses of France and Savoy, he reputedly exclaimed of the Franco-Savoyard union that "it cannot be, and will not be". Philip then sent a special envoy to the French Court to open negotiations for peace and a royal marriage.
After a marriage by proxy to the French king in Fuenterrabia, María Teresa became known as Marie-Thérèse. Her father, Philip IV, and the entire Spanish court accompanied the bride to the Isle of Pheasants, in the Bidassoa, where Louis and his court met her. On 7 June 1660, she departed from her native country of Spain. Two days later, on 9 June, the religious marriage took place in Saint-Jean-de-Luz Saint Jean-Baptiste church, which had recently been rebuilt on the site of the former 13th century church burned several times in the 15th and 16th centuries.

Besides the Grand Dauphin (see below), Louis XIV and Maria Theresa had three other children, none of whom lived more than half a year. Their names were Anne-Élisabeth (18 November 1662 – 30 December 1662), Marie-Anne (16 November 1664 – 26 December 1664) and Louis-François (14 June 1672 – 4 November 1672).

Louis, Dauphin of France

French Line

End of a Dynasty
"Louis XVII" or Louis-Charles, the Duke of Normandy, was the last male heir of the direct line of descent from Louis XIV. After his death in the temple in 1795, the succession rights passed to his uncle (the title of "Heir-Male" of Louis XIV would also have passed to him), who eventually became Louis XVIII of France, a younger brother of the Duke's Father, Louis XVI of France, and was as such a member of the senior line of descent from Louis XIV and the Bourbon-Vendôme line of the House of Bourbon.

After Louis XVIII's death, the throne went to yet another brother of Louis XVI, Charles, Count of Artois, who ascended the throne as Charles X of France. His son, Louis-Antoine, Duke of Angoulême, married Madame Royale, daughter of his uncle, Louis XVI of France, in a move to unite both lines of Royal Family. However, the duke and Madame Royale never had any children. Louis-Antoine was King of France for just about 20 minutes, after his father's abdication, but was himself forced to sign his abdication, granting all rights to the Duke of Orléans, who became Louis-Philippe, King of the French.

However, the remaining descendants of Charles X refused to give up their claims. From this struggle emerged the Legitimist and the Orleanist parties, the former of which supported the cause of Henri, Comte de Chambord, grandson of Charles X, and the latter supported the deposed House of Orléans, to which Louis-Philippe belonged and were his subsequent descendants. Therefore, according to primogeniture rules, Henri, Count de Chambord was the Heir-Male of Louis XIV and also the Legitimist claimant of the throne of France.

The Spanish Line
Henry, Count of Chambord died childless on 24 August 1883.  He was the last descendant in the legitimate male line from Louis de France, Duke of Burgundy (duc de Bourgogne), eldest grandson of Louis XIV.  Burgundy's youngest brother, Charles, Duke of Berry, died without any surviving issue.  There remained only the descendants of Philip V of Spain, formerly Philippe de France, Duke of Anjou, who was Louis XIV's second grandson.  Some French royalists recognized Louis-Philippe's grandson, Philippe, Count of Paris, as the rightful heir; others transferred their loyalty to members of the Spanish Royal Family who were descended from Philip V of Spain.

In the aftermath of the War of Spanish Succession, Philip inherited the throne of Spain, but had to renounce his claim to the French throne as part of Treaty of Utrecht, in a move by the Grand Alliance powers to prevent the union of the two Crowns.  This makes the pretendership pass from Chambord to the heir of Louis XIV's brother the duke of Orléans.  Legitimists regard this as invalid, because under the fundamental law of French monarchy neither a king nor his heirs can renounce the claim to a throne they hold but do not possess.

Moreover, Philip quickly revived Spanish ambition; taking advantage of the power vacuum caused by Louis XIV's death in 1715, Philip announced he would claim the French crown if his infant nephew Louis XV died, and attempted to reclaim Spanish territory in Italy, precipitating the War of the Quadruple Alliance in 1717.

After the death of Henry, Count of Chambord, Louis XIV's senior descendant was Henry's distant cousin and brother-in-law, Juan, Count of Montizon, who was also the Carlist pretender to the throne of Spain, as he was the son of Carlos, Count of Molina. He was proclaimed Jean III, King of France and Navarre. He issued a declaration saying, "Having become Head of the House of Bourbon by the death of my brother-in-law and cousin, the Count of Chambord, I declare that I do not in any way renounce the rights to the throne of France which I have held since my birth".

Carlist Claimants

After his death, his sons and grandson, succeeded to the titles. His youngest son, Alfonso Carlos, willed his rights to the Spanish throne to Xavier, Duke of Parma, who became the Carlist pretender.

At the death of Alfonso Carlos in 1936 most Carlists supported Prince Xavier of Bourbon-Parma whom Alfonso Carlos had named as regent of the Carlist Communion.

A minority of Carlists supported Archduke Karl Pius of Austria, Prince of Tuscany, a grandson through the female line of Carlos VII.

Spanish Legitimists

The rights to the throne of France passed to the line of Francis, Duke of Cadiz, who was the son of his grandfather's youngest brother. Francis was Isabella II's consort; therefore the claim was inherited by the Spanish Royal Family in the person of King Alfonso XIII. The title was next inherited by the eldest-surviving son of Alfonso, Infante Jaime, Duke of Segovia and subsequently his grandson and great-grandson.
The current heir-male of Louis XIV and the representative of the rights of Philip V of Spain to the French throne is Louis Alphonse, Duke of Anjou, who is the second cousin of the present king of Spain, Felipe VI.

Marie Louise Élisabeth
However, if a non-Salic primogeniture is followed, the eldest surviving descendant, in other words, the heir-general of Louis XIV is the present Duke of Calabria. With the death of the Madame Royale, daughter of Louis XVI, the direct line of the French royal family became extinct. At her death, the heir-general of Louis XIV was also its heir-male – Henri, Count of Chambord ("Henri V"), who was the nephew of her husband and first cousin, Louis Antoine, Duke of Angoulême. However, with his death, the titles split, with the French succession rights passing to the descendants of Philip V of Spain and the status of heir-general passing to his sister, Louise Marie Thérèse d'Artois, who married Charles III, Duke of Parma, himself a direct descendant of Philip V of Spain. It is through this descent that the Duke of Calabria holds the designation of heir-general of Louis XIV.

The Duke is also a descendant of Louis XIV through another line. Louis XV's eldest daughter, Princess Louise Élisabeth of France married Philip, Duke of Parma, a son of King Philip V of Spain and Elisabeth Farnese.

Marie Thérèse de France

Philippe Charles de France

Illegitimate issue

By Louise de La Vallière

Marie Anne de Bourbon

By Françoise-Athénaïs, Marquise de Montespan
Louis XIV and Françoise-Athénaïs had seven children in total and she was his most notorious mistress. Two of their children died very young. Their names were Louise Françoise de Bourbon (late March 1669 – 23 February 1672) and Louis-César de Bourbon (20 June 1672 – 10 January 1683).

Louis-Auguste de Bourbon, Duke of Maine

Louise-Françoise de Bourbon

Louis César de Bourbon

Louise Marie Anne de Bourbon

Françoise-Marie de Bourbon

Françoise-Marie de Bourbon
The House of Bonaparte is also descended from House of Orleans

Louis-Alexandre de Bourbon, Count of Toulouse

See also
Descendants of Henry IV of France
Descendants of Philippe I, Duke of Orléans
Descendants of Philip V of Spain
Descendants of Charles III of Spain, son of the precedent
Bourbon Claim to the Spanish Throne

References

External links
Genealogy of the House of Bourbon

French nobility
French royalty
House of Bourbon (France)
House of Bourbon (Spain)
Louis XIV
House of Orléans
Louis XIV of France